Global Fishing Watch is a website launched in September 2016 by Google in partnership with Oceana and SkyTruth "to provide the world’s first global view of commercial fishing activities."  At any moment, 200,000 vessels are publicizing their locations via the Automatic Identification System (AIS).

Global Fishing Watch enables users with Internet access to monitor fishing activity globally, and to view "individual vessel tracks, exclusive economic zones, marine protected areas, and other features."  It is hoped that the initiative can help to reduce "global overfishing, illegal fishing and habitat destruction."

The technology was made publicly available at the 2016 US State Department's Our Oceans Conference in Washington, DC.  The project was partly financed by the Leonardo DiCaprio Foundation.

See also
Overfishing
Fish migration
Fish farming
MarineTraffic, an open website providing information and tracking of shipping vessels at real-time

References

External links
Global Fishing Watch

2016 in the environment
Environmental impact of fishing
American environmental websites
Fishing and the environment
Internet properties established in 2016
Environmental monitoring
Fisheries databases